Kalawao County is a county in the U.S. state of Hawaii. It is the smallest county in the 50 states by land area and the second-smallest county by population, after Loving County, Texas. The county encompasses the Kalaupapa or Makanalua Peninsula, on the north coast of the island of Molokai. The small peninsula is isolated from the rest of Molokai by cliffs over a quarter-mile high; the only land access is a mule trail.

Because of the small population, Kalawao County does not have the same functions as other Hawaii counties. Instead, it is a judicial district of Maui County, which includes the rest of the island of Molokai. The county has no elected government.

It was developed and used from 1866 to 1969 for settlements for treatment of quarantined persons with Hansen's disease (leprosy).

History

The Kingdom of Hawaii, the Republic of Hawaii, the Territory of Hawaii, and the state of Hawaii all exiled persons suffering from Hansen's disease to the peninsula, from 1866 to 1969. The quarantine policy was only lifted after effective antibiotic treatments were developed that could be administered on an outpatient basis and patients could be rendered non-contagious.

Many of the residents nonetheless chose to remain on the peninsula, as they believed their disfigurements from the illness would make reintegration into society impossible. The state promised that they could live there for the rest of their lives. No new patients, or other permanent residents, were later admitted. Visitors are permitted only as part of official tours. State law prohibits anyone under the age of 16 from visiting or living there, although exceptions have been made for children visiting their relatives.

In 1980, the Kalaupapa National Historical Park was established to preserve the county's history and environment. It is coterminous with the boundaries of Kalawao County.

Government
Kalawao County lacks a local, county government. Instead, Kalawao County is administered by the Hawaii Department of Health because of the history of the settlement and current patients living there. Under Hawaiian state law, the Director of the Hawaii Department of Health, who is appointed by the Governor, also serves as the Mayor of Kalawao County.  The Mayor holds executive powers within the county; the mayor also appoints a county sheriff, who is selected from local residents. The only county statutes that apply to Kalawao County directly are those on matters of health.

Kalawao is part of the First Judicial Circuit, which includes the entire island of Oahu. For the purpose of notarization, the designated venue for the First Judicial Circuit is "State of Hawaii, City and County of Honolulu."

Geography

By land area, it is the smallest true county in the United States; some independent cities in Virginia are smaller and are sometimes considered to be “county equivalents” for statistical purposes such as with the US Census Bureau.

Kalaupapa Peninsula
Kalaupapa Peninsula contains the county's only settlement, Kalaupapa. The Kalaupapa Peninsula developed from lava that erupted from the ocean floor near Kauhakō Crater and spread outward, forming a low shield volcano. This was the most recent volcanic episode on the island and of the larger East Molokai shield volcano, occurring after the formation of the cliffs by erosion.

Subdivisions

Kalawao County is composed of four ahupuaʻa. From west to east:

Demographics

As of the census of 2000, 147 people, 115 households, and 21 families resided in the county, declining to 90 inhabitants in 2010. The population density was 11 people per square mile (4/km2). The 172 housing units produced an average density of 13 per square mile (5/km2). The racial makeup of the county was 48% Pacific Islander, 26% White, 17% Asian, 3% from other races, and 6% from two or more races. Hispanic or Latino of any race made up 4%. Kalawao County has the highest Pacific Islander population percentage of any U.S. county, and is the only county where they make up a plurality.

2% of households housed children under the age of 18. 17% were married couples living together. 3% had a female householder with no husband present. 81% were non-families. 79% of all households were made up of individuals, and 31% had someone living alone who was 65 years of age or older. The average household size was 1.28 and the average family size was 2.27.

2%  under the age of 18, 1% from 18 to 24, 18% from 25 to 44, 46% from 45 to 64, and 32. who were 65 years of age or older. The median age was 59 years. For every 100 females, there were 98.6 males. The population has declined since 1900:

Current residents include 16 former patients, 40 federal employees who work on preservation projects, and some state-employed health workers.

Transportation
The only access to Kalawao County is by air, or by a steep mule trail that descends 1,600 feet from the rest of Molokai.  Kalaupapa Airport has scheduled air service to Molokai Airport and to Honolulu Airport.

Freight is delivered to the county once a year, usually in July, by barge.

Politics

Like the rest of the state, Kalawao County is a stronghold for the Democratic Party. It was the only county in the United States where the Republican candidate in the 2016 United States presidential election, Donald Trump, finished in third by only getting one vote; 70% of Kalawao's voters chose Democratic nominee Hillary Clinton, and 25% of Kalawao voters cast their ballots for Green Party candidate Jill Stein, making it Stein's strongest county nationwide in terms of vote percentage. In 2020 Joe Biden improved on Clinton's 2016 performance by over 25% as the Greens declined to zero votes, giving Biden 96% of the vote, which was his strongest performance in any county in the United States.

Education
The county is within the Hawaii Department of Education school district.

References

External links
 
 

 
Molokai
Hawaii counties
1905 establishments in Hawaii
Populated places established in 1905
Maui County, Hawaii